John Merrill, from London, England, is a leading marathon walker. He attended Westbourne School in Sheffield, Grosvenor House School in Harrogate, and Wennington School in Wetherby, Yorkshire, between 1955 and 1961. 
He is active in two areas: firstly undertaking extremely long walks, and secondly publishing books about walking, dealing with both his experiences and describing routes for readers to follow. In January 2003, he was made an Honorary Master of Derby University, for his walking and writing. He also lectures extensively about walking. He is a keen skier both downhill and cross country, a cyclist and qualified Qigong teacher.

His father invented and patented a chemical pump that he manufactured – The Merrill Pump – which sold worldwide.

On 17 July 2010, Merrill was ordained as an independent multi-faith minister.

Marathon walks undertaken
Some of his main walks:

Hebridean Journey – .
Northern Isles Journey – .
Irish Island Journey – .
Parkland Journey – .
Land's End to John o' Groats – .
First walk around entire British coastline – 
Across America – coast to coast 
Appalachian trail 
Pacific crest trail 
Continental divide 
Buckeye trail, first thru hike, 
Across Europe – Holland, Belgium, France, Switzerland – the Alps end to end to Nice – then round the Mediterrean to Spain and across the Pyrenees to Hendaye – 107 days, 3,000 miles with 600,000 feet of ascent.
Le Puy to Santiago 
Seville to Santiago 
Laos, Algarve via Fatima to Santiago 
East of England Heritage Route – 
Entire coastline of Great Britain –   – first ever undertaking.
St. Olav's Way – Norway 420 miles, from Oslo to Trondheim.
First crossing of the Jotunheimen mountains and glaciers over a month. Crossed 28 glaciers and climbed all the highest peaks.
Hong Kong – 400 miles – walked all the trails on the islands.
Himalayas – Alpine-style route to Everest Base Camp & Cho Oyu; Around Annapurna and to Annapurna base camp; the Lantang Valley; Kashmir & Ladakh.
All the trails and mountains in New Mexico – 2,000 miles.
Chesapeake and Ohio Canal 0– 230 miles.
The Cathars Way – 200 miles
The Bon Hommes Way – 220 miles
Pilgrimage to St. Gillies du Gard – 180 miles.
East of England Pilgrimage Walk – 420 miles.
Winchester to Mont St. Michel – 180 miles.
Paris to Mont St. Michel – 280 miles.
Essex Coast Walk – 320 miles.
Offa's Dyke Path, Wales – 177 miles. A walk undertaken in preparation for the round Britain walk.

Overall
His challenge walks have raised more than £1.3 million.

Books published

Merrill is author of more than 500 walking guides which he prints and publishes himself, and his book sales are in excess of 4 million. His best-known work is possibly Turn Right at Land’s End, about his walk around Britain’s coastline. He has created many long-distance walks including The Limey Way, The Peakland Way, and Jennifer's Challenge Walk and more than 50 day challenge walks, which have been used to raise more than £1.3 million for different charities. He has also written about non-walking matters such as Essex Witch Walks, Legends of Derbyshire, Sir Richard Arkwright, Sir Joseph Paxton and other famous Derbyshire figures.

Walking practices

Merrill has a walking methodology which involves never taking breaks during a day's walk, carrying no water, travelling unaccompanied and walking thirty miles a day and more at a constant rate of three miles per hour. He has suggested that the limit of endurance is approximately 200 miles per week. He claims on his website that "you need to walk  before you are settled into the task and have comfy feet. After  you are really adjusted and by  you can push yourself relentlessly. By  of continuous walking you are at your peak performance, but after  you are physically declining."

See also
 Long-distance trail
 Walking
 Hiking
 Backpacking

References

External links
 John Merrill Foundation

Living people
English sportswriters
Walkers of the United Kingdom
English male non-fiction writers
Year of birth missing (living people)